Juri Kurakin (born 3 August 1987) is a former competitive ice dancer who is best known for his partnership with Barbora Silná for Austria. Together, they won three Austrian national titles and reached the final segment at three ISU Championships. Earlier in his career, Kurakin competed for Estonia and Bulgaria.

Personal life 
Kurakin was born 3 August 1987 in Tallinn, Estonia. He is the younger brother of Dmitri Kurakin, an ice dancer who competed internationally for Estonia and Germany.

Career

Early career 
Kurakin began learning to skate in 1992. Early in his career, he competed with Alexandra Baurina for Estonia.

In 2005, Kurakin began skating with Ina Demireva, with whom he represented Bulgaria. Initially coached by Oksana Potdykova, Demireva/Kurakin decided to train under Svetlana Alexeeva and Elena Kustarova in Moscow in the 2006–07 and 2007–08 seasons. They switched to Oleg Volkov and Alexander Zhulin for their final season together, 2008–09.

Partnership with Silná 
Kurakin teamed up with Czech-Austrian skater Barbora Silná in 2010. The two decided to represent Austria. In the 2010–11 season, they were coached by Dmitri Sildoja and Vitali Schulz in Dortmund and Vienna. The following season, training under Muriel Zazoui and Romain Haguenauer in Lyon and Graz, they won their first Austrian national title. During the next two seasons, they finished second to Kira Geil / Tobias Eisenbauer at the Austrian Championships. In the 2013–14 season, they switched to Barbara Fusar-Poli in Milan.

Having missed qualifying for the free dance at three ISU Championship, Silná/Kurakin were successful for the first time at the 2015 Europeans in Stockholm, where they finished 18th. At the 2015 Worlds in Shanghai, they ranked 21st in the short and did not advance further.

Stefano Caruso joined Fusar-Poli as the duo's coach in the 2015–16 season. Silná/Kurakin reached the final segment at the 2016 Europeans in Bratislava and at the 2016 Worlds in Boston, where they placed 17th and 20th, respectively. They announced their retirement on 3 August 2016 due to Silná's back problems.

Programs

With Silná

With Demireva

Results 
CS: Challenger Series; JGP: Junior Grand Prix

With Silná for Austria

With Demireva for Bulgaria

With Baurina for Estonia

References

External links 

 
 

Bulgarian male ice dancers
Estonian male ice dancers
Austrian male ice dancers
Living people
1987 births
Figure skaters from Tallinn
Estonian people of Russian descent